Exochomus childreni is a species of lady beetle in the family Coccinellidae. It is found in North America.

Subspecies
These two subspecies belong to the species Exochomus childreni:
 Exochomus childreni childreni Mulsant, 1850
 Exochomus childreni guexi LeConte, 1852

References

Further reading

 

Coccinellidae
Articles created by Qbugbot
Beetles described in 1850